|}

The Killiney Novice Chase is a Grade 3 National Hunt chase in Ireland. It is currently ran at Punchestown Racecourse in early January, over a distance of 2 miles and 4 furlongs.

The race was run at Leopardstown Racecourse over a distance of 2 miles and 3 furlongs from its first running in 1995 to 2017. The race changed venues in 2018 due to the creation of the Leopardstown Dublin Festival. This new meeting "combines the feature races from Leopardstown’s current three stand-alone meetings in late January and mid-February".

Prior to 2010 the race was titled the Paddy Fitzpatrick Memorial Novice Chase.  In 2010 it was called the MCR Chase, in 2011 it was called Tote Pick Six Killiney Novice Chase and in 2012 and 2013 the race was sponsored by Boylesports and run as the Boylesports.com Bet On Your Mobile Novice Chase. Boylesports continued to sponsor the race in 2013 when the title reverted to the Killiney Novice Chase. From 2016 it was sponsored by the Ladbrokes Coral bookmaking group.  It was downgraded from Grade 2 to Grade 3 in 2017. The race was sponsored by Total Event Rental for the 2018 and 2019 runnings. There was no race sponsor in 2020.

Records
Most successful jockey (5 wins):
 Davy Russell - 	Ten Poundsworth (2003), Hear The Echo (2007), Merchent Paddy (2009), Magnanimity (2011), Sir Des Champs (2012)  

Most successful trainer (8 wins): 
 Willie Mullins –  Glencove Marina (2008), Sir Des Champs (2012), Djakadam (2014), Vautour (2015), Killultagh Vic (2016), Yorkhill (2017), Invitation Only (2018), Carefully Selected (2020)

Winners

See also
 Horse racing in Ireland
 List of Irish National Hunt races

References

Racing Post:

National Hunt races in Ireland
National Hunt chases
Punchestown Racecourse